Plouhinec can refer to two municipalities in the French region of Brittany:

Plouhinec, Finistère
Plouhinec, Morbihan